Sarraméa is a landlocked commune in the South Province of New Caledonia, an overseas territory of France in the Pacific Ocean. It and neighbouring Farino are the only two communes on the island that do not border the sea. With a population of (rounded by the nearest hundred) 500, Sarraméa is the least populous commune of not only South Province, but all of New Caledonia.

References

Communes of New Caledonia